Andrew Gara (born 15 August 1878; date of death unknown) was an Irish footballer who played as a forward.

Club career
Gara joined Wigan County on the foundation of the club in 1897, scoring against Nelson in the FA Cup in October of the same year.

After impressing in a friendly match against Preston North End Gara joined Preston for a reported fee of £100, where he averaged close to a goal every other game, top scoring in the 1900–01 season with 11 goals, despite Preston's relegation that season. Gara would then have a short spell with Nottingham Forest, making 6 appearances and scoring once on his home debut against Aston Villa.

He would then join Second division Bristol City, where he scored 6 goals in 18 games, before returning to the Lancashire Combination league with Earlestown, who would be promoted at the end of his season with the club. He would remain in the Lancashire Combination for the remainder of his playing career, with three spells at Ashton Town as well as time with Southport Central and Eccles Borough, before retiring in 1908.

International career
Gara was selected for Ireland during the 1901-02 British Home Championship, scoring three goals on his debut against Wales. One of Gara's international shirts is in the collection of the National Football Museum

References

Irish association footballers (before 1923)
NIFL Premiership players
Association football forwards
Northern Ireland amateur international footballers
Pre-1950 IFA international footballers
Preston North End F.C. players
Nottingham Forest F.C. players
Bristol City F.C. players
Ashton Town A.F.C. players
Year of death missing
1878 births
Eccles United F.C. players
Earlestown F.C. players